A trapper is a person who engages in animal trapping.

Trapper may also refer to:

Places
 Trapper Lake (disambiguation), several lakes
 Trapper Mountain, Washington, United States
 Trapper Peak (Canada), a mountain in the Waputik Range, on the border between Alberta and British Columbia
 Trapper Peak (Montana), United States, a mountain in the Selway-Bitterroot Wilderness Area

Fictional characters 
 Trapper (Dungeons & Dragons), monster type found in some fantasy role-playing games
 Trapper John McIntyre, a character in the M*A*S*H franchise

Sports 
 Trapper (ice hockey), goaltending equipment
 Tilburg Trappers, a Dutch hockey team
 Edmonton Trappers, a Canadian former minor league baseball team
 Fitchburg Trappers, a defunct American minor league ice hockey team
 Salt Lake City Trappers, an short-lived American former minor league baseball team
 Trapper, the mascot for Fort Vancouver High School, Vancouver, Washington

Other uses
 Trapper Nelson (1909–1968), American trapper, hunter and founder of a zoo in Florida
 Coal trapper, a person who operates a trap door in a coal mine
 Trapper hat, a fur hat similar to an ushanka
 Trapper, a slang term for a person who partakes in the illegal drug trade
 Trapper, a pattern of pocketknife
 Trapper, file folder storable in a Trapper Keeper

See also
 Albert Johnson (criminal) (died 1932), Canadian fugitive nicknamed the "Mad Trapper"